Pablo Monsalvo (born 17 January 1983, in Roque Pérez, Argentina) is an Argentine former professional footballer who played as a midfielder.

References

External links
 Pablo Monsalvo at BDFA.com.ar 

1983 births
Living people
Association football midfielders
Argentine footballers
Argentine expatriate footballers
Newell's Old Boys footballers
Instituto footballers
Club Atlético Huracán footballers
Olimpo footballers
Racing Club de Avellaneda footballers
AIK Fotboll players
Audax Italiano footballers
Allsvenskan players
Expatriate footballers in Chile
Expatriate footballers in Sweden
Sportspeople from Buenos Aires Province